Somam Rural District is a rural district (dehestan) in Rankuh District, Amlash County, Gilan Province, Iran. At the 2006 census, its population was 3,332, in 961 families. The rural district has 18 villages.

References 

Rural Districts of Gilan Province
Amlash County